"Down That Road" is a song by American pop, country & rock singer Alisan Porter. It was Porter's coronation single following her victory on the tenth season of the singing competition The Voice.

Chart performance
"Down That Road" debuted at number 100 on US Billboard Hot 100 chart for the second week beginning on June 11, 2016.

Formats and track listings
Digital download
 "Down That Road (The Voice Performance)"– 3:52

Charts

Release history

References

2016 singles
2016 songs
Country ballads
Pop ballads
Songs written by Ilsey Juber
Universal Music Group singles